is a Japanese former paralympic badminton player. She participated at the 2020 Summer Paralympics in the badminton competition, being awarded the silver medal in the women's singles SU5 event. Suzuki also participated in the women's doubles SL3–SU5 event, being awarded the bronze medal with her teammate, Noriko Ito.

Suzuki announced her retirement from para-badminton on 4 September 2022.

Personal life 
Suzuki was born in Koshigaya, Saitama Prefecture. She was born with a disability that prevented her right arm from rising above her shoulder. She started playing badminton in third grade and eventually competed in able-bodied competitions.

Achievements

Paralympic Games 
Women's singles

Women's doubles

World Championships 

Women's singles

Women's doubles

Asian Para Games 

Women's singles

Asian Championships 
Women's singles

International Tournaments (16 titles, 7 runners-up) 
Women's singles

Women's doubles

References

Notes

External links 
Paralympic Games profile

Living people
Place of birth missing (living people)
Japanese female badminton players
Paralympic badminton players of Japan
Paralympic bronze medalists for Japan
Paralympic silver medalists for Japan
Paralympic medalists in badminton
Badminton players at the 2020 Summer Paralympics
Medalists at the 2020 Summer Paralympics
1987 births